New World orioles are a group of birds in the genus Icterus of the blackbird family. Unrelated to Old World orioles of the family Oriolidae, they are strikingly similar in size, diet, behavior, and strongly contrasting plumage. As a result, the two have been given the same vernacular name.

Males are typically black and vibrant yellow or orange with white markings, females and immature birds duller. They molt annually. New World orioles are generally slender with long tails and a pointed bill. They mainly eat insects, but also enjoy nectar and fruit. The nest is a woven, elongated pouch. Species nesting in areas with cold winters are strongly migratory, while subtropical and tropical species are more sedentary.

The name "oriole" was first recorded (in the Latin form oriolus) by the German Dominican friar Albertus Magnus in about 1250, which he stated to be onomatopoeic, from the song of the European golden oriole.

One of the species in the genus, Bahama oriole, is critically endangered.

The genus Icterus was introduced by the French zoologist Mathurin Jacques Brisson in 1760 with the Venezuelan troupial as the type species. The name is the Latin word for a yellow bird, probably the Eurasian golden oriole.

The genus name Icterus as used by classical authors, referred to a bird with yellow or green plumage. Icterus is from Greek ἴκτερος (íkteros, “jaundice”); the ictērus was a bird the sight of which was believed to cure jaundice, perhaps the Eurasian golden oriole. Brisson re-applied the name to the New World birds because of their similarity in appearance.

Species list
The genus contains 33 extant species.

One extinct species, the Talara troupial (Icterus turmalis), is known from fossil remains recovered from the Talara Tar Seeps of northwestern Peru, and likely went extinct during the late Quaternary. It may have been a close associate of Pleistocene megafauna communities, and may have gone extinct following their collapse in populations.

References

External links

New World oriole videos, photos and sounds on the Internet Bird Collection

Orioles